Samsun City Hospital (Turkish: Samsun Şehir Hastanesi) is a full-service city hospital located in the Canik district of Samsun, Turkey that is under construction. Construction began in 2020 with estimated completion in late 2023. It is expected to be the largest hospital in Samsun Province and the Black Sea Region.

History
The project has 1.069 billion TL in financing by the Turkish government and various banks. Groundbreaking took place in November 2020. The hospital is a public–private partnership between the Turkish Ministry of Health and private interests. It would be the first city hospital in Samsun to be operated by the Turkish Ministry of Health.

Construction began in 2020 with expected completion in late 2023.

Site
The City Hospital is located on a slope in the Canik district near the regional bus station south of Ankara Highway. The campus covers 213,886 square meters and includes a central hospital complex and parking garage. New roads to the campus are under construction as the hospital complex is in a primarily agricultural edge district adjacent to the urbanized core.

Facilities 
The hospital is designed for 651 single beds, 197 intensive care units, 16 inmates and 36 palliative beds, for a total of 900 beds, 275 polyclinics and 43 patient support areas. The hospital is planned to include 40 operating rooms, 1 hybrid operating room, 5 physical therapy units, advanced pathology laboratories and other specialized units. The hospital includes an earthquake isolator, solar energy system, surface parking for 300 vehicles and an enclosed garage for 1503 vehicles. Officials claim that the building will be an environmentally friendly structure that aims for the goal of zero waste.

Samsun City Hospital will have offices for gynecology, pediatrics, general surgery and plastic surgery. Plans include polyclinics in every field and special operating rooms for cardiovascular surgery.

See also
 Başakşehir Çam and Sakura City Hospital
 Ankara Etlik City Hospital
 Ankara City Hospital

References

Hospitals in Turkey
Buildings and structures in Samsun Province